Matti Kurki, in Swedish Matts Kurck, was a legendary Finnish chieftain of the birkarls. If he was a real person, he is thought to have lived in the late 13th century, at that time when king Magnus the Barnlock ruled the Kingdom of Sweden.

Folklore tales tell about Matti Kurki, particularly in the Satakunta province (Vesilahti, Pirkkala), but also in Lapland. The first written reference to Matti Kurki dates from the 17th century.

The best known tale concerns his duel with Pohto, a Russian-Karelian warrior. The battle would have taken place near the Manor of Laukko.

Matti Kurki was supposedly the ancestor of the Finnish noble family of Kurki. The lands of the Laukko manor were, according to legends, either compensation for subjugating some of the Sami to the Swedish crown by extracting taxes from them, or for his valor and deeds in the wars against the Danish enemies of the King of Sweden, or defending the eastern frontier from Novgorodian raiding parties. There is also a possibility that the manor was already in the family for many generations and that this gift was merely a tax exemption for the manor in perpetuity.

Legacy
The name has been used as a traditional name in the Finnish Navy, two ships have so far carried the name in the 20th century:
The gunboat  (1918–1940)
The Bay-class frigate Matti Kurki (1962–1975)

References

13th-century births
13th-century European people
People of medieval Finland
People whose existence is disputed
Year of death unknown